The Royal Bavarian State Railways' sole class S 2/6 steam locomotive was built in 1906 by the firm of Maffei in Munich, Germany.  It was of 4-4-4 wheel arrangement in the Whyte notation, or 2'B2' h4v in the UIC classification scheme, and was a 4-cylinder, von Borries, balanced compound locomotive.  It was initially assigned No. 3201.

The inspiration was partly the two Prussian S 9 cab forward 4-4-4s of two years previously.  Unlike those locomotives, the S 2/6 was strictly conventional in all respects apart from wheel arrangement, driving wheel size and streamlining.  Many aspects of the design were borrowed from the earlier Maffei design of the Baden IId 4-4-2 class; Anton Hammel was the chief designer for both.  The locomotive was designed and built in only 4 months.

Design 
For the first time in Germany, a cast steel locomotive frame after American practice was used.  This was lighter and more slender for the same degree of strength, and contributed to the locomotive's graceful, lightweight appearance.

While the locomotive was not disguised by a streamlined casing, a degree of air-smoothing was applied, with a conical smokebox front, a smoothly curved plate covering the area beneath the smokebox down to the buffer beam and out to the cylinders, and streamlined fairings around the stack and steam dome. The front of the cab was faired in to the boiler top and firebox sides in a smooth, streamlined curve.

A very large fire-grate area was provided, which gave the locomotive free-steaming qualities; its grate area was in fact larger than many later express passenger locomotives.  Only the Baden IV h 4-6-2 and DRG Class 45 2-10-2 locomotives ever had larger fireboxes in Germany; even the record-breaking DRG Class 05 4-6-4s had fireboxes no larger than the S 2/6.  This was partly because Bavarian coal was of lower quality than that available in Prussia and elsewhere.  Large ashpans extended down on both sides of the locomotive, between the driving wheels and trailing truck, allowing for long runs before they needed to be emptied.

The S 2/6 was the first large Bavarian locomotive fitted with a superheater, and thus the one fitted was of cautiously small heating area.  This was one of the few places in which the design could have been considered lacking.

Speed record 
Before being placed into regular service, the S 2/6 underwent a significant number of test runs, mostly between Munich and Nuremberg or Augsburg.  On one Munich to Augsburg test run on July 2, 1907, hauling a train of four express passenger cars, the locomotive attained a speed of 154.5 km/h, a German record not bested for 29 years and only exceeded by (briefly) world record-holder 05 002.  Professional estimates of the locomotive's power output were on the order of 2,200 PS (2,170 hp, 1,618 kW) during this run.

Operating history 
After testing was complete, No. 3201 was assigned to the Munich No.1 locomotive shed.  It did not distinguish itself in service, largely because its unique specification did not suit it to the duties of any other locomotive.  However, it proved more efficient than the larger Bavarian S 3/6 4-6-2 "Pacifics", although obviously with a lesser hauling ability.  Its riding and tracking qualities came in for some criticism; this may have been because the leading and trailing trucks were not equalised with the driving wheels.

In 1910, the locomotive was transferred to the Rhineland-Palatinate region, assigned to the Ludwigshafen locomotive depot.  The locomotive found greater appreciation there, and was affectionately nicknamed the "Zeppelin".  It was assigned the same duties as the Bavarian S 2/5 (4-4-2 "Atlantics") and the Palatine P 4, locomotives more its equal in hauling capacity and its lessers in terms of performance.

The locomotive returned to Bavaria in 1922, initially assigned to the Munich depot and, from 1923, to Augsburg.

Retirement 
The Deutsche Reichsbahn-Gesellschaft assigned the locomotive the classification of BR 15 in their 1925 renumbering and classification scheme.  It did not bear this long; No. 3201 was removed from service later that year and returned to Maffei for restoration, during which it was restored to its original livery.  Following this, it was exhibited at the Munich Transport Exhibition, following which it was placed in the Nuremberg Transport Museum, where it remains to this day.  It is now displayed next to 05 001.

See also
 Royal Bavarian State Railways
 List of Bavarian locomotives and railbuses

References 

 
 

Railway locomotives introduced in 1906
4-4-4 locomotives
Land speed record rail vehicles
S 2 6
Compound locomotives
Standard gauge locomotives of Germany
2′B2′ h4v locomotives
Passenger locomotives